Howard Community College (HCC or Howard CC) is a public community college in Columbia, Maryland. It offers classes for credit in more than 100 programs, non-credit classes, and workforce development programs. In addition to the main campus in Columbia, courses are also held at two satellite campuses.

History

In 1966, Howard Community College was founded by the Board of Education in Howard County and formally authorized by the Howard County Commissioners Charles E. Miller, J. Hubert Black, and David W. Force. The board recommended that the college would operate under a separate budget than the school system. The first HCC board would be drawn from the current state appointed county school board. HCC was approved as the State of Maryland's 14th community college in late 1967.

The school was built on a prehistoric Native American settlement which became the site of the Dieker farm, which was later inherited by Gustave Basler's (1858-1938) wife Dora Dieker. Alfred Christian Bassler sold his share of his father's 400 acre Cedar Lane farm to Community Research and Development to be the site of the project; the sale included a trade of land in Clarksville off of Shepherd Lane. His family home, barn, granaries and silos were demolished in 1969. In October 1970, the first classes took place in a new structure called the Learning Resources Center, now the James Clark Jr. Library Building, with 10 full-time faculty and just over 600 full-time students attending classes in HCC's nine credit programs.

HCCs first president was Dr. Alfred J. Smith Jr, former dean of faculty at Corning Community College, hired in June 1969. In 1973, he signed a five-year contract to remain as president. In 1976, Smith faced scrutiny for accounting expense allowances from the County which funded 35% of operational costs. Dwight Burrill took the role of dean in 1981, serving for seventeen years. In 1980, the Columbia Film Society moves to the HCC performing arts center for weekend movies.

Dr. Mary Ellen Duncan became president of the college in 1998, followed by Dr. Kathleen Hetherington in 2007. In 2019 HCC won the Malcolm Baldrige National Quality Award in the category of education. That same year, the original ST and Nursing buildings were remodeled and renamed Academic Commons and Howard Hall, respectively

Campus

The HCC main campus is located in Columbia, MD and is made up of 14 buildings, including a Welcome Center, located 35 minutes south of Baltimore and 50 minutes north of Washington, D.C. There are satellite campuses in Laurel at the Laurel College Center (LCC) and Training & Development Solutions Center.

In 2003, a new instructional building was completed, the Mary Ellen Duncan Hall for English, Languages & Business, which includes a landscaped area now known as The Quad. The Student Services Building, completed spring 2007, is the most recent building added to The Quad. The Student Services Building was renamed The Rouse Company Foundation Student Services Hall in March 2007. In 2013, the Health Sciences Building opened and the HCC Men's Track and Field team won the 2013 NJCAA Outdoor Track and Field.

The Peter and Elizabeth Horowitz Visual and Performing Arts Center opened in the fall of 2006. The center is home to three performance venues, two art galleries, two dance studios and multiple instructional facilities for HCC's Arts and Humanities Programs. Performance venues include the 250-seat Horowitz Center Studio Theatre, the 119-seat Monteabaro Recital Hall and  the 424-seat Smith Theatre. The center caters to numerous community events in addition to home of the Howard County Community Dance Festival, HCC Music Guest Artist in Residence Series, HCC Jazz Festival and Rep Stage.

In November 2014, a groundbreaking was held for a 145,300 sq ft four-story Science Engineering and Technology (SET) building. The facility replaces 260 parking spots to provide labs focused on Howard County Economic Development Agency initiatives including 3D printing and cybersecurity. The SET Building opened for classes in the summer of 2017, providing dedicated laboratories, a rooftop telescope observation area, and more than 1,000 total classroom seats.

Academics
There are eight academic divisions at Howard Community College. They include:
 Arts & Humanities: encourages students to exercise and grow their talents and creativity through the Arts and Humanities
 Business & Computer Systems: presents innovative and up-to-date curricula for beginning baccalaureate programs or for business careers
 Continuing Education & Workforce Development: noncredit courses for home, work, and life
 English & World Languages: mastery of essential academic skills in reading, writing, critical thinking, cultural and global competencies, and world languages proficiency
 Health Sciences: career programs in a range of specialties and transfer programs
 Mathematics: curricula for pure mathematics disciplines and applied mathematics areas
 Science, Engineering & Technology: transfer programs to prepare students as well as career programs
 Social Sciences & Teacher Education: focus on the relationships between people and within their environments

Notable alumni

References

External links

Two-year colleges in the United States
Community and junior colleges in Maryland
Universities and colleges in Howard County, Maryland
Educational institutions established in 1966
1966 establishments in Maryland
NJCAA athletics